X4: Foundations is a space trading and combat game developed and published by Egosoft. It is the seventh and most recent installment in the X series, following X Rebirth (2013). The game runs on Linux and Microsoft Windows.

Gameplay
Similar to previous titles in the X game series, X4: Foundations incorporates open-ended (or "sandbox") gameplay. There are various types of game scenarios that affects which ship the player will start with. The game takes place in a universe that is active even when the player is not present, involving simulated trade, combat, piracy, and other features. The player as an individual may take part in these or other actions to gain notoriety or wealth, going so far as to be able to construct their own space installations and command fleets of starships, establishing what amounts to their own personal empire and dynamically and drastically altering the game world in the process.

Reception

The game has had a lukewarm critical reception, holding a score of 59/100 on Metacritic, indicating "mixed or average reviews". Critics consistently noted that the title was a significant improvement over its predecessor, X Rebirth.

References

External links

2018 video games
Science fiction video games
Space trading and combat simulators
Video games developed in Germany
Video game sequels
Windows games
Linux games
X (video game series)
Video games with Steam Workshop support
Video games set in the 30th century